Colorado's 35th Senate district is one of 35 districts in the Colorado Senate. It has been represented by Republican Rod Pelton since 2023. Prior to redistricting the district was represented by Republicans Cleave Simpson and Larry Crowder.

Geography
District 35 covers a vast swath of Southeastern Colorado's plains and mountain towns, including all of Alamosa, Baca, Bent, Conejos, Costilla, Crowley, Custer, Huerfano, Kiowa, Las Animas, Mineral, Otero, Prowers, Rio Grande, and Saguache Counties and parts of southern Pueblo County. Communities in the district include Creede, Center, Monte Vista, Del Norte, Manassa, Alamosa, Alamosa East, San Luis, Walsenburg, Silver Cliff, Colorado City, Trinidad, La Junta, Rocky Ford, Fowler, Ordway, Eads, Las Animas, Lamar, and Springfield.

The district is split between Colorado's 3rd and 4th congressional districts, and overlaps with the 46th, 47th, 60th, 62nd, and 64th districts of the Colorado House of Representatives. At over 26,000 square miles, it is the largest state legislative district in Colorado.

Recent election results
Colorado state senators are elected to staggered four-year terms. The old 35th district held elections in presidential years, but the new district drawn following the 2020 Census will hold elections in midterm years.

2022
The 2022 election will be the first one held under the state's new district lines. Incumbent Senator Cleave Simpson was redistricted to the 6th district, which won't be up until 2024; State Rep. Rod Pelton is running in the 35th district instead.

Historical election results

2020

2016

2012

Federal and statewide results in District 35

References 

35
Alamosa County, Colorado
Baca County, Colorado
Bent County, Colorado
Conejos County, Colorado
Costilla County, Colorado
Crowley County, Colorado
Custer County, Colorado
Huerfano County, Colorado
Kiowa County, Colorado
Las Animas County, Colorado
Mineral County, Colorado
Otero County, Colorado
Prowers County, Colorado
Pueblo County, Colorado
Rio Grande County, Colorado
Saguache County, Colorado